Larry Ridley (born September 3, 1937) is an American jazz bassist and music educator.

Biography
Ridley was born and reared in Indianapolis, Indiana. He began performing professionally while still in high school in the 1950s. He studied at the Indiana University School of Music and later at the Lenox School of Jazz.  Ridley has been involved in jazz education, heading the jazz program at Rutgers University.

David Baker, another Indianapolis native and notable jazz musician, was one of his prime mentors. Ridley was bassist for David Baker's Big band during his studies at Indiana University.

Ridley served as chairman of the Jazz Panel of the National Endowment for the Arts (NEA) and was the organization's National Coordinator of the "Jazz Artists in Schools" Program for five years (1978–1982). Ridley is a recipient of the MidAtlantic Arts Foundation's "Living Legacy Jazz Award", a 1998 inductee the International Association for Jazz Education Hall of Fame (IAJE), an inductee of the Downbeat Magazine Jazz Education Hall of Fame, a recipient of the Benny Golson Jazz Award from Howard University, and was honored by a Juneteenth 2006 Proclamation Award from the New York City Council. Ridley is currently the Executive Director of the African American Jazz Caucus, Inc., an affiliate of IAJE. He is also the IAJE Northeast Regional Coordinator. He continues to actively teach as Professor of Jazz Bass at the Manhattan School of Music. Ridley is currently serving as Jazz Artist in Residence at the Harlem based New York Public Library/Schomburg Center for Research in Black Culture. He established an annual series there dedicated to presenting the compositions of jazz masters that are performed by Ridley and his Jazz Legacy Ensemble.

Discography

As leader
 1975: Sum of the Parts (Strata-East)
 1989: Live at Rutgers University (Strata-East)

As sideman
With Chet Baker
Chet Baker Quartet/Live in France 1978, one track only, (Gambit Records, 2005)
With Bill Barron
Hot Line (Savoy, 1962 [1964])
With Kenny Burrell 
Groovin' High (Muse, 1981 [1984])
With Al Cohn
Play It Now (Xanadu, 1975)
With Dameronia
Live au Theatre Boulogne-Billancourt (1989)
With Teddy Edwards 
The Inimitable Teddy Edwards (Xanadu, 1976)
With Red Garland
The Nearness of You (Jazzland, 1961)
With Dexter Gordon
 The Panther! (Prestige, 1970)
With Stéphane Grappelli and Joe Venuti
Venupelli Blues (Affinity, 1969)
'With Bunky Green
My Babe (Vee-Jay, 1960 [1965])
With Slide Hampton
Somethin' Sanctified (Atlantic, 1960)
With Roy Haynes
Cracklin' (New Jazz, 1963)
Cymbalism (New Jazz, 1963)
With Freddie Hubbard
Hub Cap (Blue Note, 1961)
Blue Spirits (Blue Note, 1965) 
The Night of the Cookers (Blue Note, 1965)
With Philly Joe Jones
To Tadd with Love (Uptown, 1982) with Dameronia
 Look Stop Listen (Uptown, 1983) with Dameronia
With Jackie McLean
Destination... Out! (Blue Note, 1963)
Jacknife (Blue Note, 1965)
With Hank Mobley
Dippin' (Blue Note, 1965)
Straight No Filter  (Blue Note, 1989)
With James Moody
Feelin' It Together (Muse, 1973)
With Lee Morgan
Cornbread (Blue Note, 1965)
With Horace Silver
The Jody Grind (Blue Note, 1966)
With Lucky Thompson
Goodbye Yesterday (Groove Merchant, 1973)
With Gerald Wilson
New York, New Sound (Mack Avenue, 2003)

References

External links
 http://www.larryridley.com
 http://www.juneteenth.com

African-American musicians
Manhattan School of Music faculty
Strata-East Records artists
1937 births
Living people
American jazz educators
Musicians from Indiana
Dameronia members
21st-century African-American people
20th-century African-American people